Gervase Avenel (died 1219), Lord of Eskdale and Abercorn was a 12th-13th century noble. He served as Justiciar in Lothian between 1206 until 1215 and served as Constable of Roxburgh Castle. He was a son of Robert Avenel and Sybil. Gervase was buried in the Chapter House of Melrose Abbey.

Marriage and issue
Gervase married Sybil, of unknown parentage, and is known to have the following issue:
Gervase Avenel
Roger Avenel (died 1243)
John Avenel
Robert Avenel

References
People of Medieval Scotland Gervase Avenel, lord of Eskdale (d.1219), accessed 3 October 2018.

Year of birth unknown
1219 deaths
History of Dumfriesshire
People associated with West Lothian
Burials at Melrose Abbey